is a record label owned by Japanese entertainment conglomerate Avex Inc. The label was launched in September 1990, and was the first label by the Group.

History

Two years after Max Matsuura began a career distributing studio albums from other countries, he and his two Avex co-founders, Tom Yoda and Ken Suzuki, decided to found their own label. Aiming to compete with more established labels such as Nippon Columbia, Nippon Crown, BMG Victor, Victor Musical Industries, Toshiba-EMI, CBS/Sony, Teichiku Records, King Records, Nippon Phonogram and PolyGram K.K., they created the Avex Trax label.

The first artist to sign to the label was the band TRF, which became a success. This led to Avex Trax becoming a "house of refuge" for artists who either ended contracts with their former labels (e.g. Namie Amuro, Ami Suzuki). It also appealed to artists not content with their current labels (e.g. Gackt).

Formerly distributed by the Nippon Crown label excluding several early releases, in 1997 it became a self-distributed label together with Cutting Edge, which was formerly distributed by Toshiba-EMI.

Artists

Some of their artists include Japanese artists such as Da-iCE, AAA, Ai Otsuka, Dream, Namie Amuro, Do As Infinity, KEIKO, Every Little Thing, Gackt, Wagakki Band, Girl Next Door, Ayumi Hamasaki, Mai Oshima, Seikima-II, Dream5, SKE48, Yoji Biomehanika, S2nd, Beverly and Tokyo Girls' Style as well as foreign artists such as BoA, TVXQ, After School, Super Junior, O-Zone, U-KISS, f(x), Exo, NCT, Red Velvet and Lights Over Paris. They also released all the mix albums of the Juliana's Tokyo DJs.

References

External links
  
 Parent Company website 
 

Record labels established in 1990
Japanese record labels
Record labels owned by Avex Group
1990 establishments in Japan